Matthieu Franke (born 13 February 1985) is a German international rugby union player, playing for RC Orléans in the Fédérale 1 and the German national rugby union team. He is the brother of Guillaume Franke, who has also played for Germany. He made his debut for Germany in a game against Moldova on 11 November 2006.

Biography
Franke was born in Nanterre, France, but represents Germany in international rugby.

Franke last played for Germany against Spain on 15 November 2008. He was selected to play for Germany again in February 2010 but missed out because of a knee injury and was replaced by his brother. He had to have surgery in early March and was out of action for the coming month. In the 2006-2008 European Nations Cup Second Division campaign, Franke was Germany's most prolific scorer with 109 points, playing as a fullback.

Franke's club, RC Orléans, provides a number of players to the German team, including him, his brother, Clemens von Grumbkow and Alexander Widiker.

Franke has also played for the Germany's 7's side in the past, like at the 2008 Hannover Sevens.

Honours

National team
 European Nations Cup – Division 2
 Champions: 2008

Stats
Matthieu Franke's personal statistics in club and international rugby:

Club

 As of 30 April 2012

National team

European Nations Cup

Friendlies & other competitions

 As of 8 April 2012

References

External links
 Matthieu Franke at scrum.com
   Matthieu Franke at totalrugby.com
 Matthieu Franke  at itsrugby.fr
  Matthieu Franke at the DRV website

1985 births
Living people
French rugby union players
German rugby union players
Germany international rugby union players
People from Nanterre
RC Orléans players
Rugby union wings
Sportspeople from Hauts-de-Seine
French people of German descent